Robert Bromley (1815 – 30 December 1850) was a British Conservative Party politician, the eldest son and heir apparent of Admiral Sir Robert Howe Bromley, 3rd Baronet.

He was elected unopposed as a Member of Parliament (MP) for Southern division of Nottinghamshire at a by-election in April 1849 after the resignation of the Conservative MP Lancelot Rolleston. He died in office on 30 December 1850, aged 35, after less than two years in the House of Commons.

References

External links 

1815 births
1850 deaths
Conservative Party (UK) MPs for English constituencies
Heirs apparent who never acceded
UK MPs 1847–1852
Robert